Harcourts is an Australasian real estate company.

History
John Bateman Harcourt established the Harcourts real estate company in Wellington, New Zealand, in 1888. From 1874 John had been a partner in the merchant partnership A. P. Stuart & Co., which he bought out in 1879.

Expansion
Expanding from Wellington in 1985 under a franchising system with Collins Real Estate in Christchurch, Harcourts, its subsidiaries and/or divisions, and co-branded local real-estate companies now operate in Australia, Fiji, South Africa, Indonesia, Hong Kong, Singapore, China, Canada, and the United States; initially focusing on California but have now expanded into Oregon. They formerly had operations in Zambia.

Harcourts has over 800 offices, 5500 sales consultants and 1500 support/administration staff.

Franchising
Harcourts operates a full-service real-estate franchise model which covers residential, commercial, rural, urban projects and property management. Harcourts also operates mortgage booking with the Mortgage Express business, across New Zealand and Australia.

Operations
Harcourts operates an international support and development team consisting of directors, finance, marketing, technology, training, franchise development, and value-added services. Each market where the brand operates has an on-the-ground support team to deliver these products, services, and assistance to Harcourts franchisees.

International presence

Awards

Management

References

Real estate companies of Australia
Real estate companies of New Zealand